Ormetica fulgurata is a moth of the family Erebidae. It was described by Arthur Gardiner Butler in 1876. It is found in southern Brazil.

References

Ormetica
Moths described in 1876